was a  after Chōtoku and before Kankō. This period spanned the years from January 999 through July 1004.

Change of era
 999 : The new era name was created to mark an event or a number of events. The previous era ended and a new one commenced in Chōtoku 5, on the 13th day of the 1st month of 999.

Events of the Chōhō era
 999 (Chōhō 1, 11th month: A daughter of Fujiwara no Michinaga  is accepted into the Imperial household as Emperor Ichijō's second empress consort. Aikio, better known as Fujiwara no Shōshi (988-1074), is given the title of Chūgū.
 1001 (Chōhō 3, 11th month): The Imperial palace was destroyed by fire.
 1001 (Chōhō 3, 12th month): The widow of Emperor En'yū and the mother of Emperor  Ichijō died. She was formerly known as Fujiwara no Senshi.

Notes

References
 Brown, Delmer M. and Ichirō Ishida, eds. (1979).  Gukanshō: The Future and the Past. Berkeley: University of California Press. ;  OCLC 251325323
 Nussbaum, Louis-Frédéric and Käthe Roth. (2005).  Japan encyclopedia. Cambridge: Harvard University Press. ;  OCLC 58053128
 Titsingh, Isaac. (1834). Nihon Odai Ichiran; ou,  Annales des empereurs du Japon.  Paris: Royal Asiatic Society, Oriental Translation Fund of Great Britain and Ireland. OCLC 5850691
 Varley, H. Paul. (1980). A Chronicle of Gods and Sovereigns: Jinnō Shōtōki of Kitabatake Chikafusa.'' New York: Columbia University Press. ;  OCLC 6042764

External links
 National Diet Library, "The Japanese Calendar" -- historical overview plus illustrative images from library's collection

Japanese eras
10th century in Japan
1000s in Japan